Salima Souakri (born 6 December 1974) is an Algerian judoka who competed at four Olympic Games.

She finished in joint fifth place in the extra-lightweight (48 kg) division at the 1996 Summer Olympics, having lost the bronze medal match to Yolanda Soler of Spain. She moved up to the half-lightweight (52 kg) division, finishing seventh in the 2000 Olympic Games and fifth again at the 2004 Olympic Games in Athens. On this occasion she lost the Bronze medal match to Amarilis Savon of Cuba.

On 29 June 2020, Souakri was appointed as Secretary of State for Youth and Sports, succeeding Noureddine Morceli.

References

External links
Yahoo! Sports

1974 births
Living people
Algerian female judoka
Judoka at the 1992 Summer Olympics
Judoka at the 1996 Summer Olympics
Judoka at the 2000 Summer Olympics
Judoka at the 2004 Summer Olympics
Olympic judoka of Algeria
Mediterranean Games silver medalists for Algeria
Mediterranean Games medalists in judo
Competitors at the 2001 Mediterranean Games
21st-century Algerian people
African Games medalists in judo
Competitors at the 1995 All-Africa Games
African Games gold medalists for Algeria